Cedar Creek is an  tributary of Barnegat Bay in Ocean County in the southern New Jersey Pine Barrens in the United States.

See also
List of rivers of New Jersey

References

External links
Double Trouble State Park
U.S. Geological Survey: NJ stream gaging stations

Rivers of Ocean County, New Jersey
Rivers in the Pine Barrens (New Jersey)
Rivers of New Jersey
Tributaries of Barnegat Bay